Chiniot   is a city and the administrative headquarters of Chiniot District in the province of Punjab, Pakistan. Located on the bank of the river Chenab, it is the 28th largest city of Pakistan. It is also known for its intricate wooden furniture, architecture, and mosques, and is home to the Omar Hayat Mahal.

History

Early 
The origins of Chiniot are obscure, and historical records accurately detailing its founding are unavailable. According to some accounts, the city was founded by an ancient king's daughter named Chandan, who while on a hunting expedition, was charmed by the surrounding area, and ordered the construction of the settlement of Chandaniot, alternatively spelt Chandniot, which was named in her honour. The name Chiniot, a contracted version of the original name, eventually gained favour, though the older name had been used up until at least the 1860s.

Mughal 
During Mughal rule, Chiniot was governed as part of the subah, or province, of Lahore. The city reached is zenith under the reign of Mughal Emperor Shah Jahan, and his governor of the area, Nawab Sadullah Khan of the Thahim tribe, who served between 1640 and 1656. Under Sadullah Khan's governorship, Chiniot's famous Shahi Mosque was built. Chiniot's artisans were renowned for their skill during the Mughal era, and were employed in the decoration of the Taj Mahal, and Lahore's Wazir Khan Mosque.

Mughal decline and Sial rule 
Following the collapse of Mughal authority after the death of Emperor Aurangzeb in 1707, the local Sial tribe, a tribe of Zamindar status, s under the rule of Walidad Khan was officially granted governorship of the area on account of his loyalty to the Delhi throne. Though nominally a part of the declining Mughal realm, Walidad Khan forged an largely independent state in western Punjab that controlled the region between Mankera and Kamalia Chiniot suffered heavily during the Durrani invasion of the late 1748.

Sikh 
The Sial state around Chiniot was encroached upon by Sikh chieftains in the north, and from Multani chiefs in the south, before coming under control of the Bhangi Misl Sikhs by 1765. The Sikhs imposed an annual tribute on the Sial chief, Inayatullah Khan, which he ceased paying in 1778 before also capturing Chiniot. He died in 1787, though the city had reverted to Bhangi Sikh rule before his death.

The city suffered during the Sikh Misl states period in which the city region's Bhangis battled the Sukerchakia Misl. Chiniot was captured by Ranjit Singh in 1803, and thereafter became part of the Sikh Empire. The city was invested in Sial chief Ahmad Khan, who promised to pay tribute to Ranjit Singh's kingdom. Khan stopped paying tribute, and briefly seized full control of the region in 1808, but was decisively defeated by Ranjit Singh's forces in 1810.

British 
The city came under British rule by 1849, and the city was constituted as a municipality in 1862. In 1875, the city's population was 11,999. During the British period, a vast network of canals were laid to irrigate Punjab, resulting in the creation of many new "canal colonies" around Chiniot. Chiniot's famous Omar Hayat Mahal was built between 1923 and 1935 for a businessman who made his fortune in Calcutta.

Geography

Location 
Chiniot is at the intersection of the Faisalabad-Sargodha and Lahore-Jhang roads.

Rabwah city, the headquarters of the Ahmadiyya Community is on the other side of the Chenab River. In the center of river a worship center (or Chilla Gah) of the Sufi Bu Ali Shah Qalandar is located.

Topography 
Chiniot city lies on left bank of the Chenab River, and is located on a small rocky hill. Much of the surrounding area consists of alluvial plains, interspersed with rocky outcroppings of slate and sandstone that reach up to 400 feet in height around Chiniot.

Climate
Chiniot has a hot semi-arid climate (Köppen climate classification BSh). The weather in Chiniot is variable.

Demographics 
According to the 1998 census, the population of Chiniot Tehsil was 965,124 (included urban 172,522). According to the 2017 Census of Pakistan, the city has the population of 278,747. The language spoken is Punjabi.

Economy 
The important products of Chiniot includes silk, cotton, wheat, sugar, rice, milk, pottery, wooden furniture, etc. The city's agricultural economy is largely derived from "canal colonies" established during British rule when a vast network of canals were laid to irrigate Punjab.

Chiniot is famous for his wooden furniture, and developed as a centre of woodworking given its close proximity to the Chenab River - as timber from Kashmir would be floated down the river towards Chiniot. Chiniot's artisans are renowned for their skill, and were employed in the construction of both the Taj Mahal and Wazir Khan Mosque. The city's metalworkers, along with those of Lahore, were considered the best in Punjab during the British period, and Chinioti designs and were considered superior to those of Hoshiarpur or Jalandhar. Ramzan Sugar Mills is located at Faisalabad Road.

Education 

Educational institutions in Chiniot include
 Allama Iqbal Model School, Chiniot
 Chenab College, Chiniot
 Govt Al Islah High School, Chiniot
 Govt High School Inayatpur, Chiniot
 Govt High School Salara, Chiniot
 Govt Islamia College, Chiniot
 Govt Islamia High School, Chiniot
 Govt Primary School, Shareen Awan Chiniot
 Govt Mudrassa-tul-Banat High School, Chiniot
 Khatam e Nabuwat Institute of Modern Sciences (KIMS) College, Chiniot
 Masoomeen Foundation High School, Chiniot
 Masoomeen School and College, Chiniot
 National University of Computer and Emerging Sciences (NUCES)
 Punjab College, Chiniot
 Superior College, Chiniot
 Tips College, Chiniot
 Unified P/G Science College, Chiniot

Libraries
After his death, Sheikh Omar Hayat's palace Omar Hayat Mahal was converted into a library by the Government of Pakistan.

Transport and communication 
Chiniot is connected with the rest of Pakistan by a main highway and rail line.

Culture

Islamic occasions 
In Chiniot people celebrate Islamic occasions with great arrangements. On 12 Rabi' al-awwal, 1440th birthday celebration of the Islamic Prophet Muhammad, people of Chiniot arranged a 63-maund cake, one of the largest cakes in the world.

Furniture 
Chiniot is known for its furniture. Chinioti craftsmen and artisans have for centuries carved flowers and geometric patterns onto cellulose fibres. Masons from Chiniot are thought to have been employed during the construction of the Taj Mahal and Golden Temple.

Sport 
Cricket is the most popular sport in Chiniot. Football is also played here . Other popular sports include hockey, volleyball, basketball, badminton, tennis, kabbadi, and horse racing.

Notable people 
 
 
 Ilyas Chinioti, Politician (Member of Provincial Assembly, Punjab)
 Manzoor Ahmad Chinioti, father of Ilyas Chinioti
 Nasir Chinyoti, a famous stage drama comedy actor
 Saadullah Khan, Mughal Grand Vizier 
 Wazir Khan, a court physician in Mughal Empire, famous for the Wazir Khan Mosque, Lahore
 Muhammad Masood Lali, Politician (Member of Provincial Assembly, Punjab)
 Mian Muhammad Mansha, Prominent Businessman, owner of the MCB Bank Limited and Nishat Group
 Syed Hassan Murtaza, Politician (Member of Provincial Assembly, Punjab)
 Muhammad Nawaz, Former Director General of Pakistan Rangers (Punjab)
 Syed Anayat Ali Shah, politician (MNA)
 Qaiser Ahmed Sheikh, politician and former President of Karachi Chamber of Commerce and Industry
 Saqlain Anwar Sipra, politician in Bhawana

See also 

 Bhawana
 Lalian
 Sheikhan
 Abu Saeed
 Shahi Mosque

Notes

External links 
 Chiniot Tehsil Municipal Administration's official site
 Chiniot Map

Populated places in Chiniot District
Cities in Punjab (Pakistan)
Chiniot District
Populated places in Punjab, Pakistan